Sir Robert Dillon ( – 1579) of Newtown near Trim was an Irish judge of the Tudor era. He served as Chief Justice of the Irish Common Pleas for more than twenty years, despite repeated calls for his removal on the grounds of age and ill health.

Birth and origins 

Robert was born at the end of the 15th century, the third son of Sir James Dillon of Riverstown, County Meath, and his wife Elizabeth Bathe. His father was Baron of the Court of Exchequer. His mother was a daughter of Bartholomew Bathe of Dollardstown Castle, Athy, County Kildare. Robert was "bred to the law": Sir Bartholomew Dillon, Lord Chief Justice of Ireland, was his elder brother.

This Robert Dillon must not be confused with Bartholomew's grandson Sir Robert Dillon (died 1597), who became Chief Justice of the Irish Common Pleas a year after his grand-uncle's death. The confusion is understandable since their judicial careers overlapped to a large degree, and as Kenny (1992) points out the records of the King's Inns for the relevant period do not always make it clear which Robert Dillon is being referred to.

He was one of seven siblings, who are listed in his eldest brother's article.

Marriage and children 
Dillon married Genet (also called Elizabeth) Barnewall, daughter of Edward Barnewall of Crickstown and Elizabeth Plunket, daughter of Sir Thomas Plunket, Chief Justice of the Common Pleas.

 
Robert and Genet had four sons:
 Lucas (1530–1593), Chief Baron of the Irish Exchequer
 Roger, married Margaret, daughter of Richard Misset of Ballydromny, County Cavan
 Thomas
 John

—and three daughters:
 Jeane, married Sir Thomas Dillon of Drumrany 
 Elizabeth, married Henry Plunket, merchant and alderman of Dublin
 Alison, married Baron Slane

Dillon's son Lucas would become the father of James Dillon, 1st Earl of Roscommon.

Career 
Dillon followed his father and brother into the legal profession and became Attorney General for Ireland in 1534. In 1536-7 he accompanied Patrick Barnewall, the Solicitor General for Ireland, on a crucial diplomatic mission to England. One purpose of the mission was to prevent the Dissolution of the Monasteries from being  extended to Ireland. They were successful in the short run, but Dillon, like Barnewall, quickly dropped his opposition to the suppression and was duly rewarded with his share in the spoils. In 1638 Dillon received St. Peter's Priory at Newtown, near Trim, County Meath. The former priory became the seat of his branch of the family, which was henceforth called the Dillons of Newtown. in 1646 he received the former Carmelite Abbey at Athnecarne (also called Ardnacrany) in County Westmeath, and the monastery of Kilkenny West. He served as seneschal of Kilkenny and Governor of Athlone. Like Barnewall he played an active part in establishing the King's Inn, Ireland's first law school, and was one of the original lessees, who held the Inn from the Crown.

In 1555 he was made a justice of the Court of King's Bench (Ireland) and on 3 September 1558 was promoted Chief Justice of the Common Pleas (also called of the Common Bench). His promotion was described as being a reward for his discretion and learning. He had then the reputation of being an efficient administrator. He was, however, at least sixty when he became Chief Justice; Elrington Ball thought that he was probably nearer seventy. In 1567 he was knighted. By 1575 complaints about his age and incapacity had reached the point where Elizabeth I was actively seeking a suitable replacement for him. Sir Henry Sidney, the Lord Deputy of Ireland, described Dillon as "much spent in years, decayed in both sense and body". He was accused of neglecting his official responsibilities; he rarely attended meetings of the Privy Council of Ireland, while he neglected his judicial duties entirely, and had effectively deputised his role as chief justice to the second justice. Sidney's ally Sir William Gerard, the Lord Chancellor of Ireland, referred to Dillon as a "scarecrow", and lobbied strongly for his removal from office. It seems however that no suitable replacement could be found as Dillon remained in office until his death in 1579, when, by Ball's reckoning he may have been ninety years old.

Death and timeline 
In a letter of the 5 July 1579 Gerard reported Dillon's death to Francis Walsingham. Dillon therefore probably died shortly before the 5 July 1579. Older sources give his year of death as 1680.

Notes and references

Notes

Citations

Sources 

  – 1221 to 1690
 
 
  – N to R (for Roscommon)
 
 
  – (for timeline)
  – (Snippet view)
  – (Snippet view)
  – Viscounts
 
  – Knights bachelors & Index

1580 deaths
Attorneys-General for Ireland
Chief Justices of the Irish Common Pleas
Justices of the Irish King's Bench
People from County Meath
Year of birth uncertain